Annexation of the Jordan Valley is the proposed application of Israeli sovereignty over the Jordan Valley. The idea has been advocated by some Israeli politicians since the Israeli occupation of the West Bank began in 1967, most notably with the Allon Plan and the 2020 Trump peace plan. Israeli prime minister Netanyahu's September 2019 annexation proposal included Jericho becoming a Palestinian enclave.

The Jordan Valley

According to B'Tselem, 65,000 Palestinians and about 11,000 Israeli settlers live in the area. According to Peace Now, the proposal includes 30 settlements with 12,778 settlers, 18 illegal outposts, 15 Area A and B communities, including 44,175 Palestinians and 48 shepherding communities in Area C including 8,775 Palestinians. The area to be annexed is about 22% of the West Bank, 90% of which is in Area C and 20% of the land is Palestinian-owned.

Proposals

Allon Plan

The Allon Plan was a plan to partition the West Bank between Israel and the Hashemite Kingdom of Jordan, create a Druze state in the Israeli-occupied Golan Heights, and return most of the Sinai Peninsula to Arab control. The plan was drafted by Israeli Minister Yigal Allon shortly after the Six-Day War in June 1967. The broad aim of the plan was to annex most of the Jordan Valley from the river to the eastern slopes of the West Bank hill ridge, East Jerusalem, and the Etzion bloc, to Israel. The remaining parts of the West Bank, containing most of the Palestinian population, were to become Palestinian autonomous territory, or would return to Jordan, including a corridor to Jordan through Jericho. The Jordanian King Hussein rejected the plan. Allon died in 1980, and the following year the Israeli government passed the Golan Heights Law, effectively annexing most of the governorate.

Netanyahu Plan
On 10 September 2019 (a week before the September 2019 Israeli legislative election), Netanyahu announced his government's plan to annex the Jordan Valley, if it won the election. The map that Netanyahu displayed of the area to be annexed had several errors, incorrectly noting the location of several settlements and omitting Palestinian villages. Netanyahu said that he had received a green light from the United States' Donald Trump administration. The administration said that there had been no change in United States policy.

The next day, there was international condemnation of the proposal from Palestinians, the Arab league, Saudi Arabia, Jordan, Turkey, the UK and the UN, the latter stating "... that any Israeli move to impose its administration over the Palestinian territory would be illegal under international law." Several Israeli politicians from across the political spectrum and Hebrew media outlets described this announcement as a political stunt for votes. Most notably, Moshe Ya'alon, a Knesset Member from the Blue and White party, said that in 2014 Netanyahu agreed in principle to evacuate Jordan Valley settlements. In 2014 Ya'alon was in Netanyahu's Likud Party, serving under Netanyahu as the Minister of Defense.

On 13 August 2020, Prime Minister Netanyahu agreed to suspend the plan after signing the Israel–United Arab Emirates peace agreement, brokered by the United States.

References

 

Annexation
Politics of Israel
West Bank
Jordan River basin